William Grigsby McCormick (June 3, 1851 – November 29, 1941) was an American businessman of the influential McCormick family in Chicago, who was a co-founder of Kappa Sigma Fraternity. He also served as a Chicago alderman.

Early life and education
William Grigsby McCormick was born June 3, 1851 in Chicago.
His father was William Sanderson McCormick (1815–1865) and mother was Mary Ann Grigsby (1828–1878) of the Hickory Hill estate in Virginia.
His father managed finances for the family agricultural machinery business which became International Harvester until he died in an insane asylum in 1865. His mother then moved the family back to Baltimore, Maryland near her Virginia family estate. After she was widowed, his mother had sold her share of the family business to his better-known uncle Cyrus McCormick.

McCormick's brother Robert Sanderson McCormick (1849–1919) married the daughter of the founder of the Chicago Tribune.
Their son Chauncey Brooks McCormick with their nephew Robert R. McCormick purchased the Hickory Hill estate of Reuben Grigsby in 1929.

Kappa Sigma
He attended the University of Virginia in 1868 and 1869, where he founded the Kappa Sigma Fraternity with four other friends on December 10, 1869.  
A plaque was later affixed to his 1869 room, which was numbered 46 East Lawn, where the first Kappa Sigma meeting was held.

Mccormick's favorite drink was scotch whiskey.  He was a guest at the fraternity house named for the family in 1916.
The area is now a complex known as the McCormick Road Residence Area.
He died on November 29, 1941 at the family estate known as St. James Farm near Wheaton, Illinois.
At the time Kappa Sigma was the fourth largest fraternity in the country.

Career
First, he left the university of Virginia in May 1870 and traveled with brother Robert to Europe, returning to Baltimore in November.  He worked for two years as a banker for John S. Gittings.

In February 1875, after taking a year of travel with his new wife, and then living for a few months in Baltimore, they moved to Chicago.  He first worked for McCormick Brothers & Findlay, and then started his own business selling insurance and real estate, with offices in Chicago and New York City. He was elected as a Democrat to the Chicago City Council as alderman representing the 18th ward in 1880 for one term.

In 1884, he formed the partnership Smith, McCormick & Company to trade commodities on the Chicago Board of Trade.
He became a member of the New York Stock Exchange in 1885. The business became part of the Schwartz, Dupee & Company stock trading firm (with partners Gustavus Schwartz and John Dupee, Jr.). He worked for them until the panic of 1893. He then formed a partnership of Price, McCormick & Company with Theodore Hazeltine Price on March 18, 1895.  After some initial success, the firm ran into trouble in a failed attempt to take over Hanover Insurance in 1899.
He retired after that firm failed on May 24, 1900, due to a steep drop in the prices of cotton futures contracts. Besides losing his own money, it was reported another backer was George Crocker, son of San Francisco banker Charles Crocker.

Personal life
On October 23, 1873, he married Eleanor Brooks at the Brown Memorial Presbyterian Church in Baltimore.  His wife was daughter of former railroad executive Walter Booth Brooks.  Together, they had seven children:
 Carrie McCormick (b. 1874)
 William S. McCormick (1875-1881), died as a child
 Mary Grigsby McCormick (1878-1955), who in 1900 married Herbert Stuart Stone (son of Melville Elijah Stone whose family had founded the Chicago Daily News).
 Walter Brooks McCormick (b. 1880).
 Eleanor Harryman McCormick (b. 1882).
 Chauncey Brooks McCormick (1884–1954) was the father of Brooks McCormick (1917–2006) who was the last McCormick to lead the family firm, then called International Harvester.
 Reubenia ("Ruby") McCormick (b. 1891).

Family tree

References

External links 
 
 

1851 births
1941 deaths
McCormick family
University of Virginia alumni
Chicago City Council members
Kappa Sigma founders
Illinois Democrats